Pleasant Camp, also known as the Dalton Trail Camp, is a historic frontier police outpost near Haines, Alaska. It was established by the Canadian North-West Mounted Police in 1898 as a border station between the United States and Canada where they could control the flow of miners during the Klondike Gold Rush. It is located at Mile 40 of the Haines Highway. The post was operated by the NWP until roughly 1899. The border between the two countries was formalized in the area in 1900, resulting in the presence of this former Canadian outpost on US soil.

The camp's surviving remnants were listed on the National Register of Historic Places in 1973.

See also
National Register of Historic Places listings in Haines Borough, Alaska

References

North-West Mounted Police forts
Government buildings on the National Register of Historic Places in Alaska
Haines Borough, Alaska
Canada–United States border crossings
Klondike Gold Rush
Buildings and structures on the National Register of Historic Places in Haines Borough, Alaska
1898 establishments in Alaska
1898 establishments in Yukon